Gustav Freiherr (Baron) von Senden-Bibran (23 July 1847, Reisicht, Lower Silesia, Germany – 23 November 1909 in Berlin) was an admiral of the German Imperial Navy.

Biography
His father was a Silesian landowner who had served in the Austro-Hungarian Cavalry. He entered the Prussian Navy at age 15, never married, and dedicated his life to building a strong German Navy.

After service in the Franco-Prussian War, from 1871 to 1874 Senden-Bibran attended the post-graduate Naval War College, the Marineakademie, along with the future admiral and colleague Otto von Diederichs.

Senden-Bibran was stationed in China, Japan and the South Pacific, the Mediterranean and Constantinople. After a cruise around the world (1881–83) he was given more important commands at home.

He became Naval Adjutant or aide to Kaiser Wilhelm II 1888, and, in 1889, Chief of the German Imperial Naval Cabinet. In both positions he was very valuable for his ability to explain technical matters in a manner that the Kaiser could understand. In 1892, he became Rear Admiral and 1899, finally, Vice Admiral.

Senden-Bibran often came into strong conflict with army and civilian leaders over his naval building plans, but he often won his goals with the support of Kaiser Wilhelm II, who "had nothing but the navy in his head."  He made no secret of his goal of building a navy which would wrest world economic and political power from the British. He was accused of having "delusions of grandeur" and little knowledge of the realities of world politics and power. His period of greatest influence was in the 1890, lessening after the triumph of Tirpitz. He was something of a "naval Éminence grise" to the Kaiser, with whom he had a standing appointment to meet on Tuesday mornings, either in Berlin or Potsdam.

His power waned after the appointment of Admiral Tirpitz to the Imperial Naval Office in 1897, partly because he took the losing pro-cruiser side in the debate within the government (and for the Kaiser's ear) over whether Germany should build a cruiser fleet or a great battleship fleet.

In the controversy over where Germany should seek a base in the Far East, Senden-Bibran preferred Chusan, an island in the mouth of Hangzhou Bay.

He retired from the Naval Cabinet in 1906 in favor of Georg Alexander von Müller.

In 1903 he was made full Admiral and Adjutant General to the Kaiser. He died in 1909.

Honours and awards
German orders and decorations

Foreign orders and decorations

References

Sources
The Entourage of Kaiser Wilhelm II, 1888-1918 by Isabel V. Hull; Cambridge University Press, 2004 
Gottschall, Terrel D.: "By Order of the Kaiser. Otto Von Diederichs and the Rise of the Imperial German Navy, 1865-1902", Naval Institute Press, Annapolis, 2003. 
The Kaiser and His Court: Wilhelm II and the Government of Germany by John C. G. Röhl; Translated byTerence F. Cole, Cambridge University Press; 288 pages.
By order of the Kaiser: Otto von Diederichs and the rise of the Imperial German Navy, 1865-1902 by Terrell D. Gottschall; Institute Press, 2003, 337 pages, p. 154.

1847 births
1909 deaths
Prussian naval officers
Admirals of the Imperial German Navy
German military personnel of the Franco-Prussian War
People from Legnica County
People from the Province of Silesia
Recipients of the Military Merit Order (Bavaria), 1st class
Grand Crosses of the Order of Franz Joseph
Grand Crosses of the Order of the Dannebrog
Recipients of the Order of the Rising Sun, 3rd class
Commanders of the Order of the Netherlands Lion
Recipients of the Order of the Medjidie, 1st class
Grand Crosses of the Order of Christ (Portugal)
Commanders of the Order of the Star of Romania
Recipients of the Order of the White Eagle (Russia)
Grand Crosses of Naval Merit
Commanders Grand Cross of the Order of the Sword
Honorary Knights Grand Cross of the Royal Victorian Order